David Skrela (born 2 March 1979) is a former French rugby union footballer. He most notably played for Stade Français and Toulouse in the Top 14 as well as the French national side as a fly-half or centre. He was renowned for his tackles and his kicking skills.

Club career 
In three years at Toulouse he won the Heineken Cup and the Top 14. In the 2010 Heineken Cup Final he scored three penalties and two drop goals as Toulouse defeated Biarritz.

International career 

Skrela won his first full international cap for France on 30 June 2001 against New Zealand. He did not earn his second until six years later, when his performances for Stade Français attracted the attention of French coach Bernard Laporte. He was part of the 2007 France Six Nations and World Cup squads and played in many of the team's matches. After returning to his hometown club Toulouse he was again selected under new coach Marc Lièvremont for France's 2008 autumn tests. On 11 May 2011 he was selected by Marc Lièvremont to participate in the next 2011 Rugby World Cup. The French coach underlined Skrela's skills and maturity. Skrela was injured in the opening game against Japan and withdrew from the tournament and replaced by Jean-Marc Doussain. France were beaten in the final by hosts New Zealand.

(Source: French Rugby Federation official website profile.)

Personal life 
Skrela is the son of the famous French international rugby player and coach Jean-Claude Skrela. His sister, Gaëlle, is a professional basketball player. He is of Polish descent on his father's side. At his father's insistence, he completed a diploma in civil engineering at Toulouse's Institut National des Sciences Appliquées before beginning his rugby career full-time. He is married to Celine, and has a daughter and a son; Cabiro and Mathieu.

Honours 
US Colomiers
 European Challenge Cup: 1998

Stade Français
 French championship: 2004, 2007

Stade Toulousain
 French championship: 2011
 Heineken Cup: 2010

References

External links
 David Skrela  on ercrugby.com
 French Rugby Federation official website profile
 

1979 births
Living people
Rugby union players from Toulouse
French rugby union players
US Colomiers players
Stade Français players
Stade Toulousain players
ASM Clermont Auvergne players
French people of Polish descent
France international rugby union players
Rugby union fly-halves